From Fresh Water is a 1984 posthumous album by Stan Rogers. It was one of a series of concept albums Rogers intended to do about the regions of Canada. From Fresh Water is about the Great Lakes area of Canada, while Fogarty's Cove was an album about the Maritimes, and Northwest Passage was about the western provinces and the North.

Track listing
White Squall
The Nancy
Man With Blue Dolphin
Tiny Fish For Japan
Lock-Keeper
Half of a Heart
Macdonnell on the Heights
Flying
The Last Watch (on the Midland)
The House of Orange

1984 albums
Stan Rogers albums
Albums published posthumously